Mikuláš Peksa (born 18 June 1986 in Prague) is a Czech biophysicist, activist and Czech Pirate Party politician. He was elected as a Member of the European Parliament in the 2019 election, and sits as a member of the Greens–European Free Alliance parliamentary group.

Early career and the Czech Pirate Party
Peksa studied biophysics at the Faculty of Mathematics and Physics of the Charles University in Prague, focusing on nuclear magnetic resonance, and worked as a researcher and a software engineer.

Peksa joined the Czech Pirate Party in 2013. In the 2017 Czech legislative election, he was elected a Member of the Chamber of Deputies.

European Parliament

Election
In the 2019 European election, he was elected as a Member of the European Parliament along with Marcel Kolaja and Markéta Gregorová. Upon joining the European Parliament, he left his position of Deputy of the Czech Parliament on 6 June 2019. He joined the Greens–European Free Alliance parliamentary group.

Committee assignments
Peksa is a member of the following European Parliament committees:
European Parliament Committee on Industry, Research and Energy
Delegation to the EU-Ukraine Parliamentary Association Committee

References

External links

Mikuláš Peksa on Czech Pirate Party website

Czech Pirate Party MEPs
Living people
MEPs for the Czech Republic 2019–2024
Czech Pirate Party MPs
1986 births
Members of the Chamber of Deputies of the Czech Republic (2017–2021)
Politicians from Prague
Czech software engineers
Biophysicists
Charles University alumni
Scientists from Prague